The 2011–12 Atlantic Coast Conference men's basketball season is the 59th season for the league.

Preseason
The conference hosted its 50th annual media event, "Operation Basketball", on October 19 at the Ritz-Carlton hotel in Charlotte, North Carolina. At this event, the ACC media votes on how they believe each team will finish in the conference, the preseason All-ACC team, the preseason Player of the Year, and the preseason Rookie of the Year.

Preseason Poll
 North Carolina (57 first place votes)
 Duke (2)
 Florida State
 Virginia
 Miami
 Virginia Tech
 Clemson
 NC State
 Maryland
 Georgia Tech
 Wake Forest
 Boston College

Preseason All-ACC
Harrison Barnes (59 votes)– North Carolina
John Henson (47)– North Carolina
Tyler Zeller (46)– North Carolina
Malcolm Grant (32)– Miami
Mike Scott (20t)– Virginia
Seth Curry (20t)– Duke

Preseason Player of the Year
Harrison Barnes (57)- North Carolina
John Henson (2)- North Carolina

Preseason Rookie of the Year
Austin Rivers (57)– Duke
James Michael McAdoo (1)- North Carolina
Nick Faust (1)- Maryland

Rankings

Conference schedules

Composite matrix
This table summarizes the head-to-head results between teams in conference play. (x) indicates games remaining this season.

Boston College

|-
!colspan=9 style="background:#8B0000; color:#F0E68C;"| ACC Regular Season

|-
!colspan=9 style="text-align: center; background:#8B0000"|2012 ACC tournament

Clemson

|-
!colspan=9 style="background:#F66733; color:#522D80;"| ACC Regular Season

|-
!colspan=9 style="text-align: center; background:#F66733"|2012 ACC tournament

Duke

|-
!colspan=9 style="background:#00009C; color:#FFFFFF;"| ACC Regular Season

|-
!colspan=9 style="text-align: center; background:#00009C"|2012 ACC tournament

|-
!colspan=9 style="text-align: center; background:#00009C"|2012 NCAA tournament

Florida State

|-
!colspan=9 style="background:#540115; color:#CDC092;"| ACC Regular Season

|-
!colspan=9 style="text-align: center; background:#540115"|2012 ACC tournament

|-
!colspan=9 style="text-align: center; background:#540115"|2012 NCAA tournament

Georgia Tech

|-
!colspan=9 style="background:#CFB53B; color:#FFFFFF;"| ACC Regular Season

|-
!colspan=9 style="text-align: center; background:#CFB53B"|2012 ACC tournament

Maryland

|-
!colspan=9 style="background:#CE1126; color:#FCD116;"| ACC Regular Season

|-
!colspan=9 style="text-align: center; background:#CE1126"|2012 ACC tournament

Miami

|-
!colspan=9 style="background:#005030; color:#f47321;"| ACC Regular Season

|-
!colspan=9 style="text-align: center; background:#005030"|2012 ACC tournament

North Carolina

|-
!colspan=9 style="background:#56A0D3; color:#FFFFFF;"| ACC Regular Season

|-
!colspan=9 style="text-align: center; background:#56A0D3"|2012 ACC tournament

|-
!colspan=9 style="text-align: center; background:#56A0D3"|2012 NCAA tournament

NC State

|-
!colspan=9 style="background:#E00000; color:#FFFFFF;"| ACC Regular Season

|-
!colspan=9 style="text-align: center; background:#E00000"|2012 ACC tournament

|-
!colspan=9 style="text-align: center; background:#E00000"|2012 NCAA tournament

Virginia

|-
!colspan=9 style="background:#0D3268; color:#FF7C00;"| ACC Regular Season

|-
!colspan=9 style="background:#0D3268; color:#FF7C00;"| 2012 ACC Tournament

|-
!colspan=9 style="background:#0D3268; color:#FF7C00;"| 2012 NCAA Tournament

Virginia Tech

|-
!colspan=9 style="background:#660000; color:#CC5500;"| ACC Regular Season

|-
!colspan=9 style="text-align: center; background:#660000"|2012 ACC tournament

Wake Forest

|-
!colspan=9 style="background:#CFB53B; color:#000000;"| ACC Regular Season

|-
!colspan=9 style="text-align: center; background:#CFB53B"|2012 ACC tournament

Postseason

Season awards
Player of the Year

Tyler Zeller

Rookie of the Year

Austin Rivers

Coach of the Year
Leonard Hamilton

Defensive Player of the Year
John Henson

All-Atlantic Coast Conference

First Team
Tyler Zeller1 – North Carolina
Mike Scott – Virginia
John Henson – North Carolina
Austin Rivers – Duke
Harrison Barnes – North Carolina
1 – Denotes unanimous selection
Second Team
Kendall Marshall – North Carolina
Terrell Stoglin – Maryland
Michael Snaer – Florida State
C. J. Leslie – North Carolina State
Erick Green – Virginia Tech
Third Team
Seth Curry – Duke
C. J. Harris – Wake Forest
Lorenzo Brown – North Carolina State
Kenny Kadji – Miami
Mason Plumlee – Duke

All-ACC Freshman team
Austin Rivers1 – Duke
Ryan Anderson 1– Boston College
Dorian Finney-Smith – Virginia Tech
Shane Larkin – Miami
Nick Faust – Maryland
1 – Denotes unanimous selection

All-ACC Defensive team
John Henson1 – North Carolina
Bernard James – Florida State
Jontel Evans – Virginia
Michael Snaer – Florida State
Andre Young – Clemson
1 – Denotes unanimous selection

2012 NBA draft

The following 1st, 2nd & 3rd team All-ACC performers were listed as seniors: Tyler Zeller, Mike Scott. The deadline for entering the NBA draft is April 29, but once one has declared, the deadline for withdrawing the declaration and retaining NCAA eligibility is April 10. The deadline for submitting information to the NBA Advisory Committee for a 72-hour response is April 3.

The following ACC underclassmen have sought the advice of the NBA's undergraduate advisory committee to determine his draft prospects:
The following ACC underclassmen declared early for the 2012 draft: Austin Rivers, Harrison Barnes, Kendall Marshall, John Henson, Terrell Stoglin
The following ACC underclassmen entered their name in the draft but who did not hire agents and opted to return to college:

References